Donald Young was the defending champion but chose to play in the Japan Open instead.

Sam Querrey won the title by defeating Stefan Kozlov 6–3, 6–4 in the final.

Seeds

Draw

Finals

Top half

Bottom half

References
 Main Draw
 Qualifying Draw

Sacramento Challenger - Singles
Singles